Muniz Freire can refer to:

Muniz Freire, Espírito Santo, a municipality in the state of Espirito Santo, Brazil
José de Melo Carvalho Muniz Freire, ex-governor of that same Brazilian state